Copeton Dam is a major clay core and rock fill embankment dam with nine radial gates and a gated concrete chute spillway across the Gwydir River upstream of Bingara in the New England region of New South Wales, Australia. The dam's purpose includes environmental flows, hydro-electric power generation, irrigation, and water supply. The impounded reservoir is called Lake Copeton.

Location and features
The dam was built by the New South Wales Water Conservation & Irrigation Commission and the Department of Water Resources to supply water for irrigation. Water from the dam is now released directly into the Gwydir River which is used by irrigators downstream of the dam including for pecan nut farming, and for producing cotton, wheat, lucerne, vegetables, fruit trees, oil seeds and fodder as well as pastures for sheep and cattle. 
The gate-controlled concrete chute spillway is capable of discharging  of water per day.

This amount is much less than the  originally planned because of higher rates of absorption and evaporation along some of the irrigation channels. Despite these overestimates irrigated agriculture in the Gwydir Valley saw the area become Australia's major cotton-producing region.

Upgrade of facilities

In 2007, it was decided the dam would need an upgrade for safety reasons. The A$70 million upgrade is expected to be completed during 2013 and Stage One involves the construction of a four-bay, -wide, fuse plug spillway at Diamond Bay to enable the dam to safely pass extreme floods. Once the fuse plug is installed the dam wall will be raised and the spillway gate modified.

Spillway
Unexpected erosion of hard, sound, unweathered granite in the unlined spillway discharge channel was caused by rock failure under high in-situ compressive stress. This type of erosion due to high in-situ stress has not been reported elsewhere in the world.

Remedial works involved building a training wall to separate the original single spillway into a service spillway and a secondary (emergency) spillway. A concrete slab, anchored to the underlying rock was constructed in the floor of the main scour channel to provide some additional protection on those rare occasions when the secondary spillway will discharge water over this area. The smaller, more frequent flood events will be discharged through the service spillway onto more scour resistant rock which has performed satisfactorily to date. The secondary spillway will operate very infrequently and will only discharge when the capacity of the service spillway is exceeded.

Geological investigations for the design of these remedial works included surface stress measurements in the unlined spillway discharge channel as well as geological mapping and diamond core drilling.

Power generation
The station was completed in December 1996. The facility is managed by AGL Energy.

Recreation
Copeton Dam offers sailing, windsurfing, boating, water skiing, fishing and swimming while bushwalkers can enjoy unusual geological formations, lake and mountain views and a wide variety of plant life.

See also

 Irrigation in Australia
 List of dams and reservoirs in Australia

References

External links
 
Copeton Dam Fishing Information & Map

Dams completed in 1976
Energy infrastructure completed in 1996
New England (New South Wales)
Dams in New South Wales
Embankment dams
Hydroelectric power stations in New South Wales